The Parot doctrine (Spanish: doctrina Parot) refers to a 2006 Spanish Supreme Court decision to deny persons convicted of serious crimes specific rights that are granted by Spanish law that limit or reduce the maximum term of imprisonment.

Law
Spain is a member of the European Union and so may not change the application of lawful penalty after the crime has been committed, the regulation that the Supreme Court breached.

Article 70 of the Spanish Criminal Code of 1973 prescribed a maximum length of physical imprisonment of up to 30 years (there is no sentencing limit), and Henri "Unai" Parot was sentenced to a total of 4,797 years.

This 30-year maximum could be further reduced by good behaviour and participation in rehabilitative measures such as work and study. The central argument of that piece of legislation was that denying prisoners at least some hope of release was cruel and unusual punishment and likely to cause the offender to become violent and unmanageable. In later years, the maximum prison term was extended to 40 years.

Background
Henri Parot was sentenced in 1990 to serve several thousands of years for numerous murders and offences committed, mainly for the 1987 Zaragoza Barracks bombing as a member of the armed Basque nationalist and separatist ETA, which was a designated as a terrorist organization by Spain.

The Supreme Court reviewed his case and, in a judgement of 28 February 2006, ruled that for crimes committed before the current penal code came into effect in 1995, reductions would apply to no longer the accumulative maximum sentence of 30 years but the absolute total term of the sentence.

He was the first person to be awarded what was effectively a life sentence beyond the statutory maximum period of imprisonment and so the term "Parot doctrine" emerged.

Successful appeal
Inés del Río Prada, another ETA member, was sentenced in 1987 in a similar context as Parot to serve 3,828 years. Under the 1973 law, she was eligible for release in 2008. The Supreme Court applied the Parot doctrine and so ordered her to be detained in prison until 2017.

She appealed to the European Court of Human Rights. The Strasbourg court ruled in 2012 that the continuous detention of her was a violation of Articles 5 and 7 of the European Convention on Human Rights, which cover the right to no punishment without law and the right to liberty and security, which essentially mean that legal standards were applied to her were not in force when she committed the offences. Spain appealed, but the European Court confirmed its decision in October 2013, demanded her immediate release and ordered the Spanish government to pay €30,000 (approximately $41,000, or £25,400) in compensation to her.

The ruling is binding, and Spain committed itself to abide by it. Dozens of other convictions were affected by the ruling.

References

External links
 European Court of Human Rights condemns Spain over Eta case, BBC, 2013-10-21.
 ETA terrorists poised to walk free after European court strikes down “Parot doctrine”, El País, 2013-10-21.
 What is Spain's 'Parot Doctrine'?, EITB, 2013-10-03.

European Court of Human Rights cases involving Spain
ETA (separatist group)
Ex post facto case law